Elmwood Park Zoo is a zoo located in Norristown, Pennsylvania.

History
The zoo first opened in 1924, when a private landowner donated a small piece of property and a handful of white-tailed deer to the borough of Norristown. As time progressed, upgrades became imperative to the living conditions of the animals. The first change was the design of the cages which went from wire, the norm for the early 20th century, to realistic habitats. The first animals that were exhibited came from North and South America. The zoo’s funds were mostly given to them by the Norristown Zoological Society. The NZS achieved non-profit status as an organization in 1985 and took over ownership of Elmwood Park Zoo from the municipality of Norristown. The first huge operation that went into action was the expansion of the park that was completed in 2002, and the park size doubled from its original 8-acre size.

From 1999-2002, Elmwood Park Zoo added more offices and shops to help regulate the business flow. The most popular spot at the EPZ is their interactive playground that was made in 2001. A year later, it included more common canines and rare weasels, specifically the endangered black-footed ferret. That same year, this zoo finished its Oberkircher Discovery Center, an educational facility. Ever since the major renovations to the park over the years, the park now receives over half a million guests per year. Despite advancing old constructions, the zoo still has historical landmarks up for display, including their oldest office built in 1924. To this day, business is booming and the community remains at the heart of EPZ’s operations.

American Association of Zoo Keepers (AAZK)
The Elmwood Park Zoo American Association of Zoo Keepers (AAZK) is a non-profit organization made up of zoo professionals.

Types of animals
There are a variety of animals living in the zoo. It has two separate groups of animals: animals on exhibit and those kept educational outreach purposes. The animals that are on exhibit are the amphibians, birds, fish, mammals, and reptiles. The animals the zoo uses for educational purposes for the public are birds, mammals, reptiles, and invertebrates. The zoo also obtains animals for the different seasons. Animals on exhibit include red pandas, bison, zebras, giraffes, jaguars, otters and “Penny” the American alligator and many more.

The zoo has a North American bald eagle named Noah. Noah was born in July 2001. He is a 3 ft. bird with a wing span of 7 ft. and weights 7 lbs. At 8 weeks old, Noah took an 80 ft. fall and suffered head injuries. He had to recover the first year of his life in an animal hospital. Noah recovered from his injuries but was deemed unfit to reenter into the wild. He is now used for educational purposes to help humans with outreach programs in a rehabilitation center. In 2008, Elmwood Park Zoo adopted Noah and gained all of his rights. He has been labeled as one of the zoo’s ambassadors and helps teach people of all ages about outreach programs on wildlife conservation. Moreover, Noah serves as the mascot for the professional football team, the Philadelphia Eagles.

Threatened animal conservation
Elmwood Park Zoo promotes wildlife and resource conservation and is currently undertaking animal management programs as a part of the Association of Zoos and Aquariums (AZA). The Species Survival Plan (SSP) is the official program of the Association that Elmwood Park Zoo has adopted to help protect threatened animals. Animals that are managed by the Species Survival Plan include the following:
Capybara
Cougar
Black-footed ferret
Chilean flamingo
Panamanian golden frog
Giraffe
Jaguar
Howler monkey
White-faced saki 
Squirrel monkey
North American river otter
Burrowing owl
Chacoan peccary
North American porcupine
Prehensile-tailed porcupine
Prehensile-tailed skink
Golden lion tamarin
Puerto Rican crested toad

Land conservation
Aside from Elmwood Park Zoo’s active role in animal management conservation, the zoo is also highly active in conservation projects fixated on conserving essential natural environments. Some of the conservation projects the Zoo has contributed towards through donations include the following:
The Titi Conservation Alliance
habitat reforestation
Naranjo River Biological Corridor
environmental education
The Red Panda Network
The American Bird Conservancy
The CCCI
The Monterey Bay Aquarium "Seafood Watch".

In popular culture
In the Newbery Medal-winning fiction book Maniac Magee, the titular character lives briefly in the bison pen of Elmwood Park Zoo.

Gallery

References

External links

Zoos in Pennsylvania
Norristown, Pennsylvania
Buildings and structures in Montgomery County, Pennsylvania
Tourist attractions in Montgomery County, Pennsylvania
Zoos established in 1924
1924 establishments in Pennsylvania